Sauda is a town in Sauda municipality in Rogaland county, Norway. The town, which is also the administrative centre of the municipality, is located in a river valley at the northern end of the Saudafjorden. A large part of the industrial harbour area of Sauda is built on reclaimed land that was once underwater in the fjord.

Sauda received city status in 1998. Sauda is the largest settlement in the municipality as well as the only urban area

The newspaper Ryfylke has been published in Sauda since 1926.

The town has four churches: Sauda Church and Solbrekk Chapel in the town centre, Saudasjøen Chapel in the western suburb of Saudasjøen, and Hellandsbygd Chapel a few miles north of Sauda.  There is also a high school in the town as well as the Ryfylkesmuseet (Ryfylke museum).

History

Sauda was originally (as with many Norwegian towns/cities) an old farming village.  The village survived on agriculture and the timber industry throughout the Middle Ages.  Due to its proximity to many nearby waterfalls, several mills were built for pulp and paper.  Over time, Sauda grew up as industrialization began, especially at the start of the 1900s. Zinc mining in the late 1800s at the nearby Allmannajuvet mine caused Sauda's harbor to grow as the mining ships began arriving.

In 1915, the American company Union Carbide Corporation built the Sauda Smelteverk, a smelting factory near the centre of Sauda.  This factory led directly or indirectly to a huge development in the area. Sauda suddenly became the place people both from Rogaland county and the rest of the country moved to in order to gain employment. It was a tripling in population into a few years, with a population peak around the year 1960. Recent industry and several power development project kept alive the city and made more development.  The village received town status in 1998.

See also
List of towns and cities in Norway

References

Sauda
Cities and towns in Norway
Populated places in Rogaland
1999 establishments in Norway